David Iqaqrialu (born July 2, 1954) is a former territorial level politician from Clyde River, Northwest Territories (now  Nunavut), Canada. He served as a member of the Nunavut Legislature from 1999 until 2004.

Iqaqrialu was first elected to the Nunavut Legislature in the 1999 Nunavut general election. He won the electoral district of Uqqummiut in a hotly contested three-way race defeating former Northwest Territories MLA's Tommy Enuaraq and Pauloosie Paniloo. He served a single term in the legislature as chair of the Committee of the Whole.

Iqaqrialu ran for re-election in the 2004 Nunavut general election but was badly defeated by James Arreak finishing sixth out of seventh. His popular vote evaporated with 74% since the last election swinging to other candidates.

References

Members of the Legislative Assembly of Nunavut
21st-century Canadian politicians
Living people
People from Clyde River
Inuit from the Northwest Territories
1954 births
Inuit from Nunavut